Son of Monarchs is an American-Mexican drama film directed and written by Alexis Gambis. The film stars Tenoch Huerta Mejía, Alexia Rasmussen, Lázaro Gabino Rodríguez, Noé Hernández, Paulina Gaitán and William Mapother.

The film had its world premiere at the 2020 Morelia International Film Festival, followed by a screening at the 2021 Sundance Film Festival on January 29, 2021.

Plot
After the death of his grandmother, a Mexican biologist living in New York City returns to his hometown nestled in the majestic monarch butterfly forests of Michoacán after many years. The journey forces him to face the traumas of the past and reflect on his new hybrid identity, launching him into a personal and spiritual metamorphosis.

Cast
The cast include:
 Tenoch Huerta Mejía as Mendel
 Alexia Rasmussen as Sarah
 Lázaro Gabino Rodríguez
 Noé Hernández as Simon
 Paulina Gaitán as Brisa
 William Mapother as Bob
 Electra Avellan as Lucía

Release
The film had its premiere in the 2021 Sundance Film Festival on January 29, 2021 in the Next section, where it won the Alfred P. Sloan Prize.
The film was picked up by WarnerMedia and was released in theaters and on HBO Max on October 15, 2021.

Reception 
The review aggregator website Rotten Tomatoes surveyed  and, categorizing the reviews as positive or negative, assessed 18 as positive and 3 as negative for  rating. The site's critical consensus reads, "Son of Monarchs requires patience, but viewers attuned to its ambitious wavelength will be rewarded with a film that gracefully combines science with social identity."

References

External links
 
 
 

2020 films
2020s English-language films
2020s Spanish-language films
American drama films
Mexican drama films
2020 drama films
Alfred P. Sloan Prize winners
2020s American films
2020 multilingual films
American multilingual films
Mexican multilingual films